Prison Break: Proof of Innocence is a low-budget spin-off series of the American television series, Prison Break. Made exclusively for mobile phones, its first mobisode was published on May 8, 2006. Due to the success of the Fox network's television series Prison Break, the release of this mobisode series was an exclusive deal made between Toyota Motor and News Corporation's Fox network, allowing Toyota to sponsor exclusive content of the show and to obtain advertising exclusivity.

Each episode is approximately 2 minutes long. This series revolves around the conspiracy that put Lincoln Burrows in jail, but does not feature any of the actors or writers from the TV series, and the TV series does not acknowledge the events of this spin-off. It follows the character Amber McCall as she attempts to uncover evidence to exonerate her friend, L.J. Burrows. This mobisode series is produced by Eric Young, who also produced 24: Conspiracy, 24's mobisode series.

Promotion
The mobisodes advertise the Toyota Yaris. A ten-second advertisement of the car is shown at the beginning, and the car is incorporated into each mobisode. These are part of a campaign titled "Yaris vs. Yaris", inspired by Mad magazine's "Spy vs. Spy" with two endlessly dueling black hat and white hat spies. A total of eight different advertisements were featured in the series, which were re-used on subsequent episodes beyond the initial eight episodes.

Distribution
Aside from broadcasts on Fox Mobile on mobile phones, the episodes are published on Toyota's Prison Break webpage. They were all included in the Prison Break Season 1 DVD set bundle at Target and Best Buy.

List of mobisodes
Prison Break: Proof of Innocence was published in 26 episodes, on Toyota's Prison Break webpage on May 8, 2006.

Cast
 Mandell Maughan as Amber McCall
 John Patrick Jordan as Rob McCall
 Dheeaba Donghrer as Buzz
 Donn C. Harper as Detective Franklin

References

External links 
 

Prison Break
American television spin-offs
Mobile telephone video series